Salvia axillaris is a perennial plant native to central Mexico from San Luis Potosí to Oaxaca. It is grown in horticulture as a ground cover, as it spreads on shoots that root at the nodes. It reaches about 1 m in height, with a great deal of variety in the leaves, depending on where it is growing. The flowers are small white tubes mostly hidden inside a small dark purple calyx, with the upper lip hooded and dark purple.

Notes

axillaris
Flora of Mexico
Taxa named by Martín Sessé y Lacasta
Taxa named by José Mariano Mociño
Taxa named by George Bentham